Vašuoka is a river of  Anykščiai district municipality, Utena County, northeastern Lithuania.

Rivers of Lithuania
Anykščiai District Municipality